, known professionally as , is a Japanese actor, voice actor and singer. He is mainly known for his smooth, deep voice. During his career, he has played a wide range of characters from kind-hearted heroes (Father Remington, Maximilian Jenius, Nicholas D. Wolfwood) to twisted sociopaths (Sōsuke Aizen, Muraki Kazutaka, Enrico Maxwell and LoL champion Jhin). He is married to Rei Igarashi and works for Rush Style.

Filmography

Television animation
1981 
Queen Millennia, Millennium Thief A (as Yasushi Ōhama)

1982
Armored Fleet Dairugger XV, Tatsuo Izumo
The Super Dimension Fortress Macross, Maximilian Jenius
The New Adventures of Maya the Honey Bee, Max

1983
Aura Battler Dunbine, Burn Bunnings
Kinnikuman: Scramble for the Throne, Terryman, The Ninja, The Hawkman
The Super Dimension Century Orguss, Kei Katsuragi

1984
Heavy Metal L-Gaim, Gavlet Gablae, Preita Quoize

1986
Ginga: Nagareboshi Gin, Kisaragi
Machine Robo: Revenge of Cronos, Narrator
The Transformers: The Movie, Ultra Magnus

1987
Machine Robo: Battle Hackers, Narrator
Zillion, Baron Ricks

1988
Hades Project Zeorymer, Ritsu
The Burning Wild Man, Akira Shiranui
Saint Seiya, Sea Horse Baian
Transformers: Super-God Masterforce, Sixknight
Zillion: Burning Night, Rick

1989
Earthian, Taki
Legend of Heavenly Sphere Shurato, Harmony God Scrimil
Ranma ½, Ushinosuke Oshamanbe
Zetsuai 1989, Koji Nanjo

1990
Devil Hunter Yohko, Hideki
Dragon Ball Z, Zarbon
Project A-ko, Gail
RG Veda, Yasha-ō
The Three-Eyed One, Kido
Mado King Granzort, Iceban

1991
Brave Exkaiser, Exkaiser
Future GPX Cyber Formula, Osamu Sugo/Knight Shoemach
Kyatto Ninden Teyandee, Prince

1992
Ai no Kusabi, Raoul Am
Nangoku Shōnen Papuwa-kun, Magic Sōsui
The Brave Fighter of Legend Da-Garn, Da-Garn

1993
The Irresponsible Captain Tylor, Lieutenant Makoto Yamamoto

1994
Macross 7, Maximilian Jenius

1995
Macross Plus, Marge

1996
Mobile Suit Gundam: The 08th MS Team, Rear Admiral Ginias Saharin
Sailor Stars, Takuya Moroboshi
Shinesman, Ryoichi Hayami/Shinesman Moss Green

1997
Cutie Honey Flash, Twilight Prince/Prince Zera

1998 
All Purpose Cultural Cat-Girl Nuku Nuku DASH!, Dr. Higuchi
Detective Conan, Hamura Shuuichi (Ep. 88-89)
Record of Lodoss War: Chronicles of the Heroic Knight, Ashram
Trigun, Nicholas D. Wolfwood
Serial Experiments Lain, Deus / Eiri Masami

1999
Pet Shop of Horrors, Iason Grey

2000
Yami no Matsuei, Kazutaka Muraki
Ghost Stories, Da Vinci

2002
Detective Conan: The Phantom of Baker Street, Jack the Ripper
Gravion, Klein Sandman
Mirage of Blaze, Naoe Nobutsuna
Samurai Deeper Kyo, Oda Nobunaga

2003
Chrono Crusade, Father Ewan Remington
Machine Robo Rescue, Machine Commander Robo
Sonic X, Dr. Yuio aka Dr. Norman (Special ep. 21) (Japan Only)

2004
Angelique (OVA), Julious
Fullmetal Alchemist, Frank Archer
Gravion Zwei, Klein Sandman
Phantom - The Animation, Raymond McGuire
Samurai Champloo, Shōryū (Ep. 10)
Yakitate Japan, Meister Kirisaki

2005
Basilisk: The Kouga Ninja Scrolls, Yakushiji Tenzen
Black Cat, Charden Flamberg
Bleach, Sōsuke Aizen
Hell Girl, Gorō Ishizu
Peach Girl, Ryo Okayasu
Pokémon, Juan
SoltyRei, John Kimberley
Transformers: Cybertron, Vector Prime, Narrator

2006
Brave Story: New Traveler, Leynart
Buso Renkin, Showusei Sakaguchi
Detective Conan, Rausu Tatsuhiko (Ep. 452)
Futari wa Pretty Cure Splash Star: Tick-Tack Kiki Ippatsu!, Sirloin

2007
Baccano!, President of DD News
Detective Conan, Minowa Shouhei (Ep. 490)
Ghost Hound, Masato Kaibara/Snark
Gintama, Umibouzu
Juushin Enbu-Hero Tales, Shoukaku
Kaze no Stigma, TBC
Prism Ark, Darkness Knight, Meister
Saint Beast, Lucifer

2008
Allison & Lillia, Owen Nicht (eps 7-8)
Tales of the Abyss, Lorelei

2009
07-Ghost, Ayanami
Detective Conan, Morofushi Takaaki 
Metal Fight Beyblade, Ryūsei Hagane / Phoenix
Sengoku Basara, Narrator, Akechi Mitsuhide
White Album, Ogata Eiji

2010
Digimon Xros Wars, Wisemon
Fairy Tail, Ichiya Vandalay Kotobuki/Nichiya
Fullmetal Alchemist: Brotherhood, Judau

2011
Fate/Zero, Tokiomi Tōsaka
Gosick, Levianthan
Pretty Cure All Stars DX3: Mirai ni Todoke! Sekai o Tsunagu Niji-Iro no Hana, Sirloin
Shakugan no Shana III, Sairei no Hebi

2012
K, Miwa Ichigen
Saint Seiya Ω, Tokisada

2013
AKB0048, Mr. Sono
Brothers Conflict, Ryusei
High School DxD New, Lord Gremory
Problem Children Are Coming from Another World, Aren't They?, Jack-o'-lantern
Tokyo Ravens, Tsuchimikado Yasuzumi
Samurai Flamenco, King Torture

2014
Aldnoah.Zero, Cruhteo
Buddy Complex, Gengo Kuramitsu
Buddy Complex Kanketsu-hen: Ano Sora ni Kaeru Mirai de, Gengo Kuramitsu
Gonna be the Twin-Tail!!, Spider Guildy
Is the Order a Rabbit?, Takahiro Kafu
Shirogane no Ishi Argevollen, Julius Unios
Tokyo Ghoul, Kōsuke Hōji

2015
Aldnoah.Zero Season 2, Cruhteo
Assassination Classroom, Asano Gakuhō
High School DxD BorN, Lord Gremory
JoJo's Bizarre Adventure: Stardust Crusaders, Vanilla Ice
Castle Town Dandelion, Borscht
Shimoneta: A Boring World Where the Concept of Dirty Jokes Doesn't Exist, narration, Base Black
Chivalry of a Failed Knight, Itsuki Kurogane
Ninja Slayer From Animation, Fujio Katakura/Dark Ninja
Mobile Suit Gundam: Iron-Blooded Orphans, Iznario Fareed
Is the Order a Rabbit?? Season 2, Takahiro Kafu

2016
Assassination Classroom Season 2, Asano Gakuhō
Drifters, Akechi Mitsuhide
Undefeated Bahamut Chronicle, Warg-Kreutzer
Maho Girls PreCure!, Shakince
Taboo Tattoo, Professor Wiseman
Active Raid, Kyokai-sama

2017
 My First Girlfriend Is a Gal, IkemenJunichi (ep. 2, 5,)
 Digimon Universe: Appli Monsters, Leviathan
 Food Wars! Shokugeki no Soma: The Third Plate, Azami Nakiri
 Altair: A Record of Battles, King Zsigmond III

2018
 Cardfight!! Vanguard G: Z, Gyze (Episode 20, 21, 22, 23 as credited in the credits roll)
 Gundam Build Divers, Rommel
 Angolmois: Record of Mongol Invasion, Hindun
 Golgo 13, Leader
 Goblin Slayer, Bard, Minstrel
 Gakuen Basara, Akechi Mitsuhide
 Ace Attorney Season 2, Tristan Turnbull
 Radiant, Narrator

2019
 Gundam Build Divers Re:Rise, Captain Zeon
 Ascendance of a Bookworm, Ferdinand
 Actors: Songs Connection, Tsukasa Odawara
 Food Wars! Shokugeki no Soma: The Fourth Plate, Azami Nakiri

2020
 Somali and the Forest Spirit, Musurika
 Auto Boy - Carl from Mobile Land, Ruster 
 Ascendance of a Bookworm 2nd Season, Ferdinand
 Fire Force Season 2, Yata
 Hypnosis Mic: Division Rap Battle: Rhyme Anima, Jakurai Jinguji
 Dragon Quest: The Adventure of Dai, Baran
 Is the Order a Rabbit? BLOOM, Takahiro Kafu

2021
 Cells at Work!!, M Cell
 Idoly Pride, Kyoichi Asakura
 Farewell, My Dear Cramer, Masahiro Gotōda
 Record of Ragnarok, Odin
 Gunma-chan, Professor Monoshiri
 180-Byō de Kimi no Mimi o Shiawase ni Dekiru ka?, Jirō
 The Vampire Dies in No Time, Draus

2022
 Requiem of the Rose King, Richard, Duke of York
 Cap Kakumei Bottleman DX, Io Hocari
 Estab Life: Great Escape, Aruga
 Don't Hurt Me, My Healer!, Cow
 Ascendance of a Bookworm 3rd Season, Ferdinand
 Phantom of the Idol, Narrator
 Bleach: Thousand-Year Blood War, Sōsuke Aizen

2023
 Trigun Stampede, Religious Radio DJ
 KamiKatsu, Soichiro Urabe

ONA
7 Seeds (2019), Takashi
The Way of the Househusband (2021), Bar Master
Bastard!! 2nd Season (2023), Nils John Mifune

OVA
Dream Hunter Rem (1985), Enkō
Megazone 23 Part II (1986), Yuuichiro Shiratori
Dr. Slump: Arale-chan - The Penguin Village Fire Brigade (1986), Butao-kun
Devilman (1987), Akira Fudo/Devilman
Kaze to Ki no Uta (1987), Jack Dren
Be-Boy Kidnapp’n Idol (1989), Kou Umiura
B.B. Burning Blood (1990), Jin Moriyama
Zetsuai 1989 (1992), Koji Nanjo 
Please Save My Earth (1993), Shion
Bronze: Cathexis (1994), Koji Nanjo 
Fatal Fury: The Motion Picture (1994), Hauer Blitzer
Bronze: Zetsuai Since 1989 (1996), Koji Nanjo 
Mirage of Blaze: Rebels of the River Edge (2004), Naoe Nobutsuna
Hellsing Ultimate (2006), Enrico Maxwell
Legend of the Galactic Heroes (????), Adalbert von Fahrenheit
Record of Lodoss War (????), Orson
Voltage Fighter Gowcaizer (????), Master Ohga/Shizuru Osaki
Is the Order a Rabbit?? ~Sing For You~ (2019), Takahiro Kafu

Theatrical animation
Dragon Ball Z: Cooler's Revenge (1991), Sauzer
Legend of the Galactic Heroes: Overture to a New War (1993), Adalbert von Fahrenheit
Trigun: Badlands Rumble (2010), Nicholas D. Wolfwood
Is the Order a Rabbit?? ~Dear My Sister~ (2017), Takahiro Kafu
Dakaichi: Spain Arc (2021), Celes
Jujutsu Kaisen 0 (2021), Larue

Tokusatsu
Kamen Rider Zero-One (2020), Ark, Kamen Rider Ark-Zero
 Kamen Rider Genms - Smart Brain and the 1000% Crisis (2022), Ark

Live-action film
 Anime Supremacy! (2022), stone (voice)

Video games
Voltage Fighter Gowcaizer (1995), Master Ohga/Shizuru Osaki
Angelique series (1995-), Julious
Armored Core: Project Phantasma (1997), StingerMobile Suit Gundam Side Story: The Blue Destiny (1997), Nimbus SchterzenTobal 2 (1997), Mark the DevilTales of Destiny (1997), Woodrow KelvinJoJo's Bizarre Adventure (1998), Vanilla IcePersona 2: Innocent Sin (1999), Ginji SasakiThe Legend of Dragoon (1999), Lloyd NorilSpace Channel 5 (1999), JaguarSuper Robot Wars Alpha (2000), Laodicea Judecca Gozzo, Burn Burnings, Black Knight, Maximilian JeniusSuper Robot Wars Alpha Gaiden (2001), Maximilian JeniusAtelier Lilie: The Alchemist of Salburg 3 (2001), Ulrich MorgenSpace Channel 5: Part 2 (2002), Shadow/JaguarTales of Destiny 2 (2002), Garr KelvinTokimeki Memorial Girl's Side (2002), Goro HanatsubakiArmored Core Nexus (2004), Stinger (Revolution Disc)Super Robot Wars Alpha 3 (2005), Ephesus Judecca Gozzo, Sardis Judecca Gozzo, Philadelphia Judecca Gozzo, Maximilian JeniusSengoku Basara (2005), Akechi Mitsuhide/TenkaiPhantasy Star Universe (2006), Izuma RutsuTales of the World: Radiant Mythology (2006), Garr KelvinStar Ocean: First Departure (2007), Jie RevorseSuper Robot Wars A Portable (2007), Ginias SahalinArmored Core: For Answer (2008), MalzelSuper Robot Wars Z (2008), Kei Katsuragi, Klein SandmanDragon Ball: Raging Blast 2 (2010), SauzerSuper Robot Wars Z2: Destruction Chapter (2011), Kei KatsuragiBleach: Soul Resurrection (2011), Sosuke AizenSuper Robot Wars Z2: Rebirth Chapter (2012), Pol Potaria, Kei Katsuragi, Klein SandmanJoJo's Bizarre Adventure: All Star Battle (2013), Enrico PucciSaint Seiya: Brave Soldiers (2013), Sea Horse BaianJ-Stars Victory VS (2014), Sōsuke AizenSuper Robot Wars Z3: Hell Chapter (2014), Kei KatsuragiSuper Robot Wars Z3: Heaven Chapter (2015), Kei KatsuragiReturn to PopoloCrois: A Story of Seasons Fairytale (2015), GomerSaint Seiya: Soldiers' Soul (2015), Seahorse BaianProject X Zone 2: Brave New World (2015), ShadowJoJo's Bizarre Adventure: Eyes of Heaven (2015), Vanilla IceGranblue Fantasy (2016), ShivaValkyria Chronicles 4 (2018), BelgarFire Emblem Heroes (2017), ArvisTales of the Rays (2017), Garr KelvinSuper Robot Wars X (2018), Gengo KuramitsuSuper Robot Wars T (2019), Rabaan ZaramandCode Vein (2019), Juzo MidoJump Force (2019), Sōsuke AizenArknights (2019), HellagurSakura Wars (2019), Tekkan AmamiyaYakuza: Like a Dragon (2020), Reiji IshiodaSpace Channel 5 VR: Kinda Funky New Flash! (2020), JaguarFairy Tail (2020), Ichiya Wanderlei KotobukiALTDEUS: Beyond Chronos (2020), DeiterA Certain Magical Index: Imaginary Fest (2021), Nōkan KiharaJoJo's Bizarre Adventure: All Star Battle R (2022), Vanilla IceCardfight!! Vanguard Dear Days (2022), Kanji Meguro

Unknown dateAnother Century's Episode series, Maximillian Jenius, Kei KatsuragiAr tonelico II, ShunBrave Story: New Traveler, LeynartBS Tantei Club: Yuki ni Kieta Kako, Shunsuke UtsugiLeague of Legends, Jhin, Vel'KozMuramasa: The Demon Blade, Yukinojyo YagyuOdin Sphere, MelvinRay Tracers, TsumijiMegadimension Neptunia VII, UmioSuper Robot Wars series, Maximillian Jenius, Burn Burnings, Gavlet Gable, Klein Sandman, Kei Katsuragi, Ginias SaharinDragalia Lost, Aurien, Heinwald, Nyalarthotep

Drama CD07-Ghost (xxxx), AyanamiShinakoi (xxxx), Ango InoguchiAi no Kusabi series 2: Dark Erogenous (xxxx), RaoulAngel Sanctuary (xxxx), UrielFate/Zero (xxxx), Tohsaka TokiomiJoJo's Bizarre Adventure Drama CD Book (xxxx), Noriaki Kakyoin Ronin Warriors CD Drama Suiko-den : TouryuukiStanley Hawk no Jikenbo: Ambivalence . Katto (xxxx), AristaYami no Matsuei series 1 (xxxx), Kazutaka MurakiYami no Matsuei series 2: Summer Vacation (xxxx), Kazutaka MurakiFrom Far Away CD Drama (1999): Rachef 
Hypnosis Mic: Division Rap Battle "Matenro (On'in Rinjo)" (麻天狼-音韻臨床-) (2017), Jakurai Jinguji (ill-DOC)
Hypnosis Mic: Division Rap Battle "Fling Posse vs. Matenro" (2018), Jakurai Jinguji (ill-DOC)
Hypnosis Mic: Division Rap Battle "Mad Trigger Crew vs. Matenro" (2018), Jakurai Jinguji (ill-DOC)
Hypnosis Mic: Division Rap Battle "The Champion" (2019), Jakurai Jinguji (ill-DOC)
Hypnosis Mic: Division Rap Battle "Enter the Hypnosis Microphone" (2019), Jakurai Jinguji (ill-DOC)

Dubbing

Live-actionAndromeda, Dylan Hunt (Kevin Sorbo)The Cotton Club, Dixie Dwyer (Richard Gere)Debris, Craig Maddox (Norbert Leo Butz)Escape Plan: The Extractors, Shen Lo (Max Zhang)Good Sam, Dr. Rob Griffith (Jason Isaacs)Hawkeye, Jack Duquesne (Tony Dalton)Melrose Place, Michael Mancini (Thomas Calabro)Near Dark, Caleb Colton (Adrian Pasdar)Outlander, Frank/Jonathan Randall (Tobias Menzies)Safe House, Tom Broom (Stephen Moyer)A Series of Unfortunate Events, Lemony Snicket (Patrick Warburton)Suspiria (1986 TV Tokyo edition), Daniel (Flavio Bucci)The Theory of Flight, Gigolo (Ray Stevenson)

AnimationChuggington, JackmanMinions: The Rise of Gru, SvengeanceTrolls World Tour, Growley Pete

Discography

Albums
 (1992)Liaison (1994)Ordovices (1997)Garnitures (2000)Ren-Sa: Chaine (2001)Love Balance (2002)Idee: Ima, Boku ga Omou Koto (2003)Subete wa Boku kara Hajimatta (2005)Love Story (2007)

SinglesEien No Okusoku (1997)Shadow Maker (1997)Cactus (1997)

Talking albumsKotoba no Kuukan I (2000)Kotoba no Kuukan II (2001)Kotoba no Kuukan III (2002)Kotoba no Kuukan IV (2007)

Pure voice albumsVoice: Dakara Anata ni'' (2008)

References

External links
 Official agency profile 

 Shō Hayami at GamePlaza-Haruka Voice Acting Database 
 Shō Hayami at Hitoshi Doi's Seiyuu Database
 
 

1958 births
Living people
Japanese company founders
Japanese male pop singers
Japanese male video game actors
Japanese male voice actors
Male voice actors from Hyōgo Prefecture
Musicians from Hyōgo Prefecture
20th-century Japanese male actors
21st-century Japanese male actors
20th-century Japanese male singers
20th-century Japanese singers
21st-century Japanese male singers
21st-century Japanese singers